Jamie Andrew (born 1969) is a Scottish mountaineer.

Accident
In January 1999 Andrew and his friend Jamie Fisher got caught in a storm after having climbed the north face of Les Droites in the Mont Blanc massif. Having made it up the north face the two men were beset by snow, winds of 90 mph and temperatures of -30 °C, during 7 days, for the following four nights. On the last night Fisher died of hypothermia. Despite having developed frostbite, Andrew survived the experience, being helicoptered off the mountain by the French rescue services. His ordeal was featured on the documentary series I Shouldn't Be Alive. The episode is titled Death Climb and first aired on 26 January 2011.

After amputation
Amputation of all four limbs was necessary to save Andrew's life from septic shock. After he recovered from the surgery, he spent several months in rehabilitation. After his first walk (with no hands or feet) up Blackford Hill Andrew took part in skiing, snowboarding, paragliding, orienteering, running, hill walking, caving, rock climbing and mountaineering. He has walked up Ben Nevis, raising £15,000 for charity in the process, run the London Marathon in 2001 raising £22,000 for charity, made many ascents of 4,000 m peaks in the Alps and climbed Kilimanjaro with three other disabled mountaineers raising £5,000 for charity. In 2012 Andrew climbed the Olympic Stadium of the London 2012 games as part of Channel 4's "Meet the Superhumans" campaign to launch the Paralympic Games.

Andrew gives talks throughout the UK and in 2004 published the book Life and Limb which tells his story. According to Andrew his challenge for the future is his young daughter and twins. In April 2014 he was a guest on the BBC Radio 4 programme Midweek. Seven Summits with boparfet.

On 4 August 2016, Andrew climbed to the top of the  Matterhorn in Zermatt, accompanied by two local mountaineers.

Bibliography
Jamie Andrew, Life and Limb, Portrait, 24, 306 pp.

References

External links
 Jamie Andrew's website

Scottish mountain climbers
Scottish autobiographers
1969 births
Living people
Alumni of the University of Edinburgh